The 1974–75 Sheffield Shield season was the 73rd season of the Sheffield Shield, the domestic first-class cricket competition of Australia. Western Australia won its third Sheffield Shield championship in four seasons.

Table

Statistics

Most Runs
Rick McCosker 898

Most Wickets
Jim Higgs 39

References

Sheffield Shield
Sheffield Shield
Sheffield Shield seasons